Mary Gleason may refer to:

 Mary J. L. Gleason, justice with the Federal Court of Appeal
 Mary Pat Gleason (born 1950), American actress and writer
 Mary Smith Gleason (1899–1967), interim member of the Louisiana House of Representatives